Franco Mannino (25 April 1924 – 1 February 2005) was  an Italian film composer, pianist, opera director, playwright and novelist, born in Palermo.

He made his debut as pianist  at the age of 16. He conducted  the National Arts Centre Orchestra in Canada between 1982 and 1986, among the others.

In all he wrote more than 440 compositions including opera, ballet, oratorios, symphonies, chamber music and music for the theatre. In addition there was his music for more than a hundred films by some of the best-known directors of his day, including Luchino Visconti with whom he collaborated many times, including such films as Death in Venice.

His 1963 opera Il diavolo in giardino, from a libretto by Visconti (and collaborators) based on a Thomas Mann short story, was presented at the Teatro Massimo in Palermo in February.  Another of his works, which Visconti directed, was the ballet Mario e il Mago in 1956.

He died in Rome in 2005.

Selected filmography
 Tomorrow Is Another Day (1951)
 At the Edge of the City (1953)
 Morgan, the Pirate (1960)
 The Seventh Sword (1962)
 Gold for the Caesars (1963)
 Death in Venice (1971)
 The Driver's Seat (1974)
 Conversation Piece (1974)
 The Innocent (1976)
 Un uomo in ginocchio (1979)
 Murder Obsession (1981)

References

External links 
  
 

1924 births
2005 deaths
Musicians from Palermo
Italian classical composers
Italian male classical composers
20th-century classical composers
David di Donatello winners
20th-century Italian composers
20th-century Italian male musicians